A magnetic chicane also called a bunch compressor helps form dense bunches of electrons in a free-electron laser.  A magnetic chicane makes electrons detour slightly from their otherwise straight bath, and in that way is similar to a chicane on a road.  

A magnetic chicane consists of four dipole magnets, giving electrons at the beginning of a bunch a longer path than electrons at the end of the bunch, thereby allowing the laging electrons to catch up.

Free-electron laser
A free-electron laser depends upon a beam of tightly bunched electrons.  Short bunches of electrons are produced by a photoinjector, but they quickly grow, because electrons have negative charge and little mass, causing the bunch to expand.  As the bunch is accelerated, the electrons gain mass and quickly approach the speed of light.  After that, electrons at the end of the bunch cannot go any faster to catch up with electrons at the beginning of the bunch.

Chirp
This problem is solved by adjusting the phase of the driving electric field to more strongly add energy and mass to electrons at the trailing end of the bunch.  This is called negative energy chirp, meaning the energy decreases along the direction of beam travel.  Because the beam is traveling at almost the speed of light, the trailing electrons gain mass, rather than velocity.  This results in a correlation between mass and position in the bunch.

Chicane
The chicane gives lagging electrons a chance to catch up.  More massive electrons are deflected less by the magnetic field than lighter electrons, and therefor take a shorter path through the chicane, resulting in a shorter bunch.  A chicane consists of four dipole magnets with the following roles:

 Deflects the beam slightly away from the central axis of the accelerator, with lighter electrons deflected more than more massive electrons.
 Deflects the beam in the opposite direction, making it parallel to the central axis, but with an offset.  The offset is greatest for lighter electrons.
 Deflects the beam back towards the central axis.
 Deflects the beam back in alignment with the central axis.

Limitations
In practice, bunch compression cannot be done a single step.  To avoid beam emittance blowup, beam compression is usually done by using two chicanes.

References

External links
RF and Space Charge Emittance in Guns, a basic definition of emittance
Space Charge Induced Beam Emittance Growth and Halo Formation

Electron beam
Free-electron lasers
Accelerator physics